The Tata Steel Chess Tournament 2023 is the 85th edition of the annual chess tournament held in Wijk aan Zee. It was held from 13 January to 29 January 2023. The field of 14 players in the Masters section included the numbers one and two of the FIDE world rankings, Magnus Carlsen and Ding Liren, as well as five teenage grandmasters. Iran’s Parham Maghsoodloo was a late substitute for Poland’s Jan-Krzysztof Duda. For the first time since 2015, Carlsen lost two classical games in a row: first in round 4 against Dutch grandmaster and five-times runner-up Anish Giri, and then in round 5 against the Uzbek teenager Nodirbek Abdusattorov. Going into the last round Abdusattorov had a half point lead over Giri, but he lost his game against Dutch 2021 winner Jorden van Foreest, while Giri defeated Richárd Rapport, making Giri the tournament's winner. Germany's Alexander Donchenko won the Challengers section, securing an invitation to the 2024 Tata Steel Masters section.

Standings

{| class="wikitable" style="text-align: center;"
|+2023 Tata Steel Challengers, 13–29 January 2023, Wijk aan Zee, Netherlands, Category XIV (2587)
! !! Player !! Rating !! 1 !! 2 !! 3 !! 4 !! 5 !! 6 !! 7 !! 8 !! 9 !! 10 !! 11 !! 12 !! 13 !! 14 !! Total !! SB !!  !! TPR
|-
| 1 || align="left" ||| 2627 || || 1 || ½ || 1 ||½  ||  ½|| 1|| 1 || 0 || 1||  ½|| 1|| 1|| 1 || 10 || 60.75 || || 
|-
| 2 || align="left" ||| 2609 || 0 || || 1|| 1 ||½  ||  ½|| 1 || ½ ||1 || ½|| ½ || 1 || ½ || 1 || 9 || 54.5 || ||
|-
| 3 || align="left" ||| 2654 || ½||  0|| ||  ½|| ½|| ½ || ½ || ½ ||½ || 1 || 1 ||1  || 1 || 1 || 8½ || 47.5|| || 
|-
| 4 || align="left" ||| 2686 || 0|| 0 || ½ ||  || ½ ||½ || ½ ||½ || 1 || 1 || ½ || 1 || 1 || ½|| 7½ || 42.25|| || 
|-
| 5 || align="left" ||| 2610 || ½|| ½ ||  ½||½ ||  || 1 || 0|| ½ ||1 || ½ ||½ || ½ || 0 ||1 || 7 || 45.25|| || 
|-
| 6 || align="left" | || 2608 || ½ || ½ || ½ ||  ½|| 0||  || ½|| 1 || ½ || ½ || 1 || 0 || ½ ||1 || 7 || 43.75 ||  ||
|-
| 7 || align="left" ||| 2616 ||0 || 0 || ½ || ½ ||1  || ½ || || ½ ||  0|| 1|| ½ || 1 ||1 ||  ½|| 7 || 39.5 || || 
|-
| 8 || align="left" ||| 2585 || 0|| ½ || ½ || ½ || ½ || 0 || ½ || || ½ ||0 || 1 || 1 || 1 ||1  || 7  || 38.25 ||  || 
|-
| 9 || align="left" ||| 2627 ||1 || 0 || ½ || 0|| 0 || ½ || 1 || ½ ||  || ½|| 1||  ½|| 1 || 0|| 6½ || 41.5 || || 
|-
| 10 || align="left" ||| 2515 || 0|| ½||  0|| 0 || ½|| ½|| 0|| 1 || ½ ||  || 1 ||  ½||½ || 1 || 6 || 33.5 || ||  
|-
| 11 || align=left||| 2559 || ½ || ½ || 0 || ½ || ½ || 0 || ½ || 0|| 0 ||0  ||  || ½|| 1 || 1 || 5 || 28.5 || || 
|- 
| 12 || align="left" ||| 2425 || 0||  0||0 || 0 ||½  || 1 || 0|| 0 || ½ || ½ || ½ ||  ||1 || ½ || 4½ || 23.75 || || 
|-
| 13 || align="left" ||| 2637 || 0||  ½|| 0|| 0|| 1||  ½||  0|| 0|| 0 || ½ || 0 ||0 ||  || ½ || 3|| 19.5 || || 
|- 
| 14 || align="left" ||| 2361 ||0  ||0 || 0 || ½ || 0 ||0 ||  ½|| 0 || 1 || 0|| 0 || ½ ||½ || || 3 || 17.5 || || 
|}

Masters results by round

Pairings and results:

 

{| class="wikitable" style="font-size: 90%"
|-
|colspan=7 style="background:#cccccc;" | Round 1 – 14 January 2023
|-
| Magnus Carlsen || Levon Aronian ||align=center width="30px"| ½–½ 
|-
| Fabiano Caruana || Anish Giri ||align=center | ½–½ 
|-
| Gukesh D || Ding Liren ||align=center | 0–1 
|-
| Jorden van Foreest || Wesley So ||align=center | ½–½ 
|-
| Richárd Rapport || Nodirbek Abdusattorov ||align=center | 0–1 
|-
| R Praggnanandhaa || Arjun Erigaisi ||align=center | ½–½ 
|-
| Parham Maghsoodloo || Vincent Keymer ||align=center | ½–½
|-
|colspan=7 style="background:#cccccc;" | Round 2 – 15 January 2023
|-
| Nodirbek Abdusattorov (1) || Fabiano Caruana (½) ||align=center width="30px"| ½–½ 
|-
| Ding Liren (1) || Parham Maghsoodloo (½) ||align=center | ½–½
|-
| Vincent Keymer (½) || Magnus Carlsen (½) ||align=center | 0–1
|-
| Wesley So (½) || Arjun Erigaisi (½) ||align=center | ½–½  
|-
| Levon Aronian (½) || R Praggnanandhaa (½) ||align=center | ½–½ 
|-
| Anish Giri (½) || Gukesh D (0) ||align=center | 1–0 
|-
| Jorden van Foreest (½) || Richárd Rapport (½) ||align=center | ½–½
|-
|colspan=7 style="background:#cccccc;" | Round 3 – 16 January 2023
|-
| Magnus Carlsen (1½) || Ding Liren (1½) ||align=center | ½–½
|-
| Gukesh D (0) || Nodirbek Abdusattorov (1½) ||align=center width="30px"| ½–½ 
|-
| Parham Maghsoodloo (1) || Anish Giri (1½) ||align=center | ½–½
|-
| Fabiano Caruana (1) || Jorden van Foreest (1) ||align=center | 1–0  
|-
| Arjun Erigaisi (1) || Levon Aronian (1) ||align=center | ½–½ 
|-
| Richárd Rapport (½) || Wesley So (1) ||align=center | ½–½ 
|-
|R Praggnanandhaa (1) || Vincent Keymer (½) ||align=center | ½–½ 
|-
|colspan=7 style="background:#cccccc;" | Round 4 – 17 January 2023
|-
| Anish Giri (2) || Magnus Carlsen (2) ||align=center | 1–0
|-
| Ding Liren (2) || R Praggnanandhaa (1½) ||align=center width="30px"| 0–1 
|-
| Richárd Rapport (1) || Fabiano Caruana (2) ||align=center | ½–½
|-
| Nodirbek Abdusattorov (2) || Parham Maghsoodloo (1½) ||align=center | 1–0  
|-
| Wesley So (1½) || Levon Aronian (1½) ||align=center | ½–½ 
|-
| Vincent Keymer (1) || Arjun Erigaisi (1½) ||align=center | ½–½ 
|-
| Jorden van Foreest (1) || Gukesh D (½) ||align=center | ½–½ 
|-
|colspan=7 style="background:#cccccc;" | Round 5 – 19 January 2023
|-
| Magnus Carlsen (2) || Nodirbek Abdusattorov (3) ||align=center | 0–1
|-
| R Praggnanandhaa (2½) || Anish Giri (3) ||align=center width="30px"| ½–½ 
|-
| Fabiano Caruana (2½) || Wesley So (2) ||align=center | ½–½
|-
| Arjun Erigaisi (2) || Ding Liren (2) ||align=center | ½–½  
|-
| Levon Aronian (2) || Vincent Keymer (1½) ||align=center | 1–0 
|-
| Parham Maghsoodloo (1½) || Jorden van Foreest (1½) ||align=center | 1–0 
|-
| Gukesh D (1) || Richárd Rapport (1½) ||align=center | ½–½ 
|-
|colspan=7 style="background:#cccccc;" | Round 6 – 20 January 2023
|-
|  (2½) || Vincent Keymer (1½) ||align=center | 1–0   
|-
| Ding Liren (2½) || Levon Aronian (3) ||align=center | ½–½  
|-
| Anish Giri (3½) || Arjun Erigaisi (2½) ||align=center | ½–½
|-
| Nodirbek Abdusattorov (4) || R Praggnanandhaa (3) ||align=center | ½–½
|-
| Jorden van Foreest (1½) || Magnus Carlsen (2) ||align=center | ½–½ 
|-
| Richárd Rapport (2) || Parham Maghsoodloo (2½) ||align=center | ½–½ 
|-
| Fabiano Caruana (3) || Gukesh D (1½) ||align=center | 1–0  
|-
|colspan=7 style="background:#cccccc;" | Round 7 – 21 January 2023
|-
| Arjun Erigaisi (3) || Nodirbek Abdusattorov (4½) ||align=center | 0–1  
|-
| Levon Aronian (3½) || Anish Giri (4) ||align=center | ½–½
|-
| Parham Maghsoodloo (3) || Fabiano Caruana (4) ||align=center | ½–½ 
|-
| R Praggnanandhaa (3½) || Jorden van Foreest (2) ||align=center | 1–0 
|-
| Gukesh D (1½) || Wesley So (3½) ||align=center | 0–1 
|-
| Magnus Carlsen (2½) || Richárd Rapport (2½) ||align=center | 1–0  
|-
| Vincent Keymer (1½) ||  (3) ||align=center | ½–½  
|-
|}

{| class="wikitable" style="font-size: 90%"
|-
|colspan=7 style="background:#cccccc;" | Round 8 – 22 January 2023
|-
| Nodirbek Abdusattorov (5½) || Levon Aronian (4) ||align=center width="30px" | ½–½ 
|-
| Fabiano Caruana (4½) || Magnus Carlsen (3½) ||align=center | 0–1 
|-
| Wesley So (4½) || Ding Liren (3½) ||align=center | ½–½ 
|-
| Anish Giri (4½) || Vincent Keymer (2) ||align=center | ½–½
|-
| Richárd Rapport (2½) || R Praggnanandhaa (4½) ||align=center | 1–0 
|-
| Jorden van Foreest (2) || Arjun Erigaisi (3) ||align=center | 1–0 
|-
| Gukesh D (1½) || Parham Maghsoodloo (3½) ||align=center | 1–0 
|-
|colspan=7 style="background:#cccccc;" | Round 9 – 24 January 2023
|-
| Vincent Keymer (2½) || Nodirbek Abdusattorov (6) ||align=center |  ½–½
|-
| Ding Liren (4) || Anish Giri (5) ||align=center | 0–1  
|-
| Parham Maghsoodloo (3½) || Wesley So (5) ||align=center |  ½–½ 
|-
| Magnus Carlsen (4½) || Gukesh D (2½) ||align=center | ½–½
|-
| R Praggnanandhaa (4½) || Fabiano Caruana (4½) ||align=center | ½–½ 
|-
| Levon Aronian (4½) || Jorden van Foreest (3) ||align=center | ½–½ 
|-
| Arjun Erigaisi (3) || Richárd Rapport (3½) ||align=center | 0–1
|-
|colspan=7 style="background:#cccccc;" | Round 10 – 25 January 2023
|-
| Nodirbek Abdusattorov (6½) || Ding Liren (4) ||align=center | ½–½ 
|-
| Wesley So (5½) || Anish Giri (6) ||align=center | ½–½ 
|-
| Parham Maghsoodloo (4) || Magnus Carlsen (5) ||align=center | 0–1
|-
| Richárd Rapport (4½) || Levon Aronian (5) ||align=center | ½–½ 
|-
| Fabiano Caruana (5) || Arjun Erigaisi (3) ||align=center | ½–½  
|-
| Gukesh D (3) || R Praggnanandhaa (5) ||align=center | 1–0  
|-
| Jorden van Foreest (3½) || Vincent Keymer (3) ||align=center | ½–½ 
|-
|colspan=7 style="background:#cccccc;" | Round 11 – 27 January 2023
|-
| Anish Giri (6½) || Nodirbek Abdusattorov (7) ||align=center | ½–½  
|-
| Magnus Carlsen (6) || Wesley So (6) ||align=center | ½–½  
|-
| Levon Aronian (5½) || Fabiano Caruana (5½) ||align=center | ½–½
|-
| R Praggnanandhaa (5) || Parham Maghsoodloo (4) ||align=center | 0–1
|-
| Vincent Keymer (3½) || Richárd Rapport (5) ||align=center | ½–½ 
|-
| Ding Liren (4½) || Jorden van Foreest (4) ||align=center | ½–½ 
|-
| Arjun Erigaisi (3½) || Gukesh D (4) ||align=center | ½–½  
|-
|colspan=7 style="background:#cccccc;" | Round 12 – 28 January 2023
|-
| Wesley So (6½) || Nodirbek Abdusattorov (7½) ||align=center | ½–½  
|-
| Jorden van Foreest (4½) ||  ||align=center | ½–½  
|-
| Magnus Carlsen (6½) || R Praggnanandhaa (5) ||align=center | ½–½  
|-
| Fabiano Caruana (6) || Vincent Keymer (4) ||align=center | ½–½
|-
| Gukesh D (4½) || Levon Aronian (6) ||align=center | ½–½
|-
| Richárd Rapport (5½) || Ding Liren (5) ||align=center | 1–0
|-
| Parham Maghsoodloo (5) || Arjun Erigaisi (4) ||align=center | 1–0  
|-
|colspan=4 style="background:#cccccc;" | Round 13 – 29 January 2023
|-
| Nodirbek Abdusattorov (8) || Jorden van Foreest (5) ||align=center | 0–1  
|-
| Anish Giri (7½) || Richárd Rapport (6½) ||align=center | 1–0  
|-
| Arjun Erigaisi (4) || Magnus Carlsen (7) ||align=center | 0–1
|-
| R Praggnanandhaa (5½) || Wesley So (7) ||align=center | ½–½
|-
| Levon Aronian (6½) || Parham Maghsoodloo (6) ||align=center | 0–1
|-
| Ding Liren (5) || Fabiano Caruana (6½) ||align=center | ½–½
|-
|  || Gukesh D (5) ||align=center | ½–½  
|-
|}

References

External links 

Tata Steel Chess Tournament
2023 in chess
2023 in Dutch sport
 January 2023 sports events in the Netherlands